TVPlayer is an Internet television service in the United Kingdom, owned by international digital distribution company Alchimie. It provides access to free live television channel streams using a web browser or application software made for mobile devices. Alongside the free service, TVPlayer offers multiple no contract monthly subscriptions each carrying different premium live television channel streams.

History
TVPlayer was launched as Android and Apple iOS smartphone apps on 19 December 2013. Compatible apps for Android tablet computers and the Apple iPad were released on 30 January 2014. As of January 2017, the applications had been downloaded 2.5 million times and had over one million active viewers.

On 30 January 2017, TVPlayer announced it had launched compatibility for all Windows 10 devices.

On 26 November 2020, TVPlayer's licensing agreement with Discovery expired. As a result, Discovery, Investigation Discovery, TLC and Discovery Home & Health were no longer available on TVPlayer's Premium service and Quest, Quest Red, Really, DMAX, Food Network and HGTV were removed from the free service.

Compatible devices 
Devices and operating systems that can be used to watch TVPlayer television content:

 Laptops and desktop computers
 Microsoft Windows 10 or later (Microsoft Store app)
 Operating system with Adobe Flash Player enabled web browser
 Tablet computers and smartphones
 Microsoft Windows 10 or later (Microsoft Store app)
 Google Android 4.2 or later
 Apple iOS 11.0 or later
 Microsoft Windows 10 Mobile or later (Microsoft Store app)
 Amazon Fire Tablet
 Video game consoles
 Xbox One
 PlayStation 5
 Nintendo Switch
 Set-top box / streaming devices
 EE TV (Premium Channels Only)
 Freesat (Premium Channels Only)
 Freeview (Premium Channels Only)
 Apple TV
 Roku
 Amazon Fire TV
 Chromecast
 Android TV
 Samsung TV
 Humax H3 espresso

Available television content
There is a video on demand service allowing viewers to catch up on television programmes. Some television channels are not available on certain devices and software due to licensing rights and legal restrictions.

References

External links
 

Internet properties established in 2013
2013 establishments in the United Kingdom
Video on demand services
Streaming television
Digital television in the United Kingdom
Television networks in the United Kingdom
British brands
Mass media companies of the United Kingdom
Android (operating system) software
IOS software
Pay television
British companies established in 2013
Companies based in the City of Westminster